Pleasant Goat and Big Big Wolf: Dunk for Future is a 2022 Chinese animated film based on Dunk for Victories, the thirty-fourth season of the Pleasant Goat and Big Big Wolf television series. It is preceded by Pleasant Goat and Big Big Wolf – Amazing Pleasant Goat (2015).

Plot
Weslie (Voiced by Zu Liqing), Wolffy (Voiced by Zhang Lin) and other goats formed a basketball team called "Team Defenders" and with all the attentions and expectations, "Team Defenders" made their way to the world-class basketball event---The Basketball City Cup. They were the most competitive team to grasp the trophy but they lost it unexpectedly because of the last shot of discord. The team seemed to fall away when Weslie and Wolffy had a dispute after the finals, Wolffy stated that Weslie should have passed the ball to him for the final shot since Weslie's foot injured during the game with "Team Tigers", while Weslie disagreed as he suggested that Wolffy's shots were constant failed shots which makes no difference to the game results. However, their passion for getting the trophy of the basketball game as well as true friendships will not be destroyed easily. Jonie (Voiced by Deng Yuting) decided to assemble the members again and reform the "Team Defenders" to join the next Basketball City Cup. However their opponents were more challenged, if they wanted to get the basketball championship this time, they must face the challenge with even more efforts.

Voice cast

Team Defenders 
Zu Liqing - Weslie
Zhang Lin - Wolffy
Deng Yuting - Tibbie / Jonie
Liang Ying - Paddi
Liu Hongyun - Sparky
Gao Quansheng - Slowy
Li Tuan - Blazey

Team Tigers 
Deng Yuting - Tiger Wing
Gao Quansheng - Sierra

Team Wolves 
Deng Yuting - Victor

Other characters 
Zhao Na - Wolnie / Leopardess
Liang Ying - Wilie
Li Tuan - Tiger Dad / Lion Jay

Production
In an internal interview with the Director of this film as well as the creator of "Pleasant Goat and Big Big Wolf", Huang Weiming stated that despite the low box office earnings of the previous film, Amazing Pleasant Goat in 2015, the production team had not written off investing in more film productions, since the previous films had already covered different types of adventures in different themes. It is hoped that innovation is not the only thing they pursue but a real breakthrough when choosing the theme for a new film.

In 2017, the production team members had a thought of combining the animation with their favorite sport: basketball. In the series "Dunk for Victories" of the Pleasant Goat and Big Big Wolf TV series, which aired in 2021, had proved that this combination was successful, earning an 8.6 out of 10 score on Douban, and caused heated discussion in Hupu, a famous Chinese sports blog. The film's production started soon after that. In order to make the best film, the team made a total of 37 scripts, 74 storyboards, and 2,142 shots for trial and error during the whole film production. The production team hoped that this film would become the best film for families during the Chinese New Year.

Music

Release
The film was released on 1 February 2022, the First Day of Chinese New Year in Mainland China, alongside various other highly anticipated films including The Battle at Lake Changjin II, Nice View, Only Fools Rush In, and Too Cool to Kill etc. As a result, the number of showings of the film were less than expected, in which, only 3 to 4 percent of showings were scheduled for this film and the time of showings were also less ideal.

Reception

Box office
Four days of preview screenings were held in January 2022 in Mainland China, from 15–16 January and 22–23 January. According to "Tao Piao Piao", the film grossed 10.93 million Renminbi from these screenings.

By 31 January 2022, the film grossed more than 20 million Renminbi from the sales of advance tickets. The film had an opening day of CN¥25.87 million (US$4.07 million) ending up 7th under Sniper. The film went on to have a US$9.88 million three-day opening and a US$13.41 million five-day opening. By its first Sunday, the film had grossed CN¥102 million (US$15.36 million), already surpassing the total grossess of the previous two films in the franchise.

References

External links

2022 animated films
2022 films
2020s sports comedy films
2020s fantasy comedy films
Animated sports films
Animated comedy films
Chinese animated fantasy films
Pleasant Goat and Big Big Wolf films
2022 comedy films
Chinese basketball films
Anime film remakes
Animated films about friendship